Hypexilis pallida is a species of beetle in the family Cerambycidae. It was described by Horn in 1885.

References

Graciliini
Beetles described in 1885